Antônio Rafael Pinto Bandeira (1863-1896) was an Afro-Brazilian painter and art professor.

Biography
He was descended from slaves and his father was a tailor. At the age of sixteen, he entered the Academia Imperial de Belas Artes (AIBA). From 1879 to 1884, he studied with João Zeferino da Costa. He was a regular participant in the "Exposições Geral de Belas Artes", where he won the Gold Medal for history painting in 1883. His first personal exhibition came in 1886 at AIBA.

In 1887, after failing to win a contest that would have enabled him to study in Europe and urged on by his friend Firmino Monteiro, he moved to Salvador, where he became the Professor of Design and Landscapes at the "Liceu de Artes e Ofícios".

Returning to his hometown in 1890 he tried, unsuccessfully, to establish his own art school. He continued to exhibit successfully, but became depressed at having his efforts to launch the school repeatedly thwarted. He drowned in Guanabara Bay, apparently while attempting to launch a boat, although his family and the press suggested that it may have been suicide. The body was not recovered for almost two weeks, so he was buried without an autopsy.

His painting "Lenhador" (Woodcutter) appeared on a two-part commemorative stamp in 2013, together with a painting by Georgian artist Niko Pirosmani, to mark the establishment of diplomatic relations between the two countries.

Selected paintings

References

Further reading 
 José Roberto Teixeira Leite, Pintores negros do oitocentos, Edição Emanoel Araújo. São Paulo: MUMMIFY, 1988

External links

 Georgian Journal: "Brazil Dedicates Stamp to Diplomatic Relations" by Ketevan Charkhalashvili.

1863 births
1896 deaths
People from Niterói
19th-century Brazilian painters
19th-century Brazilian male artists
Deaths by drowning